The Saudi Geological Survey (SGS) is the national geological survey of the Kingdom of Saudi Arabia.

History and profile
The SGS was established as an independent entity attached to the ministry of petroleum and mineral resources following a council of ministers decision in 1999. It is built from other governmental agencies, including the former directorate general for mineral resources, the US Geological Survey (USGS) mission (1963–1999) and the Bureau de Recherches Géologiques et Minières (BRGM) mission (1972–1999).

Activities
The Saudi Geological Survey activities covers a broad range of strategic and applied earth science topics, with emphasis on understanding the geologic, economic, and engineering factors that affect sustainable management of mineral and groundwater resources, detection and mitigation of earthquakes and other geohazards, protection and management of the environment, and safe development of engineering and construction sites.

The bulk of the work involves:

 Geological Mapping
 Mineral Exploration
 Mining Development
 Environmental Geology
 Environmental Geohazards
 Hydrogeology

See also

 United States Geological Survey
 British Geological Survey

References

External links
 Saudi Geological Survey website

1999 establishments in Saudi Arabia
Government agencies established in 1999
Government agencies of Saudi Arabia
Organisations based in Jeddah
National geological agencies
Geological surveys